Romuald Fonkoua (born 1961 in Cameroon) is a professor of Francophone literature at the Faculty of Letters of Sorbonne University where he directs the International Center for Francophone Studies.

Biography
Romuald Fonkoua studied literature in Cameroon and France, earning a doctorate in general and comparative literature from the University of Lille. Fonkoua lectured at University of Cergy-Pontoise before becoming a professor of Francophone literature at the University of Strasbourg. Since 2000, he has been a teaching fellow at Middlebury College. Fonkoua directs the "Lettres francophone" collection of the Sorbonne University Presses (SUP) and co-directs the "Bibliothèque francophone" collection at Classiques Garnier.

He has been editor-in-chief of Presence Africaine since 1999.

Fonkoua's work focuses on questions of general Francophone literature, its history, sociology, and biographies of writers.

Works
 1998 Romuald Fonkoua. Les discours de voyages, Afrique - Antilles, Paris, Karthala, coll. "Lettres du Sud".
 2001 Romuald Fonkoua and Pierre Halan. Les Champs littéraires africains, Paris, Karthala.
 2002 Romuald Fonkoua. Essai sur une mesure du monde au xxe siècle : Édouard Glissant, Paris, Honoré Champion.
 2003 Romuald Fonkoua, Bernard Mourails and Anne Piriou. Robert Delavignette savant et politique : 1897-1976, Paris, Karthala.
 2010 Romuald Fonkoua. Aimé Césaire, 1913-2008, Paris, Perrin.
 2012 Romuald Fonkoua, Eléonore Reverzy and Pierre Hartmann. Les Fables du Politique des Lumières à nos jours, Strasbourg, Strasbourg University Press.
 2018 Romuald Fonkoua and Muriel Ott. 'Les héros et la mort dans les traditions épiques, Paris, Karthala.

References

1961 births
Cameroonian people
Cameroonian literature
Middlebury College faculty
Sorbonne University
Living people